The Far Side Gallery is an anthology of Gary Larson's The Far Side comic strips. Cartoons from previous books The Far Side, Beyond the Far Side, and In Search of the Far Side are featured, all of which were printed from 1982 to 1984.

1984 books
The Far Side